Aldo-Nsawila Kalulu Kyatengwa (born 21 January 1996) is a French professional footballer who plays as an attacking midfielder and striker for  club Sochaux. He is a former France youth international.

Club career

Lyon
Kalulu is a youth exponent from Lyon. He made his Ligue 1 debut on 12 September 2015 against Lille OSC replacing Jordan Ferri after 78 minutes in a 0–0 home draw.

He scored his first goal against Bastia on 23 September 2015, assisted by Steed Malbranque.

Basel
On 26 June 2018 FC Basel announced that they had signed Kalulu on a three-year deal until June 2021. Kalulu joined Basel's first team for their 2018–19 season under head coach Raphaël Wicky and later Marcel Koller. After playing in three test games Kalulu played his domestic league debut for the club in the home game in the St. Jakob-Park on 21 July 2018 as Basel were defeated 1–2 by St. Gallen. He scored his first goal for his new club on 18 August in the Swiss Cup away game as Basel won 3–0 against amateur club FC Montlingen.

Under trainer Marcel Koller Basel won the Swiss Cup in the 2018–19 season. In the first round Basel beat FC Montlingen 3–0, in the second round Echallens Région 7–2 and in the round of 16 Winterthur 1–0. In the quarter finals Sion were defeated 4–2 after extra time and in the semi finals Zürich were defeated 3–1. All these games were played away from home. The final was held on 19 May 2019 in the Stade de Suisse Wankdorf Bern against Thun. Striker Albian Ajeti scored the first goal, Fabian Frei the second for Basel, then Dejan Sorgić netted a goal for Thun, but the result remained 2–1 for Basel. Kalulu played in four cup games and scored that one game mentioned above.

In the first half of the season Kalulu played regularly, however, in the second half of the season he had just seven appearances and these as substitute. Therefore the club looked for a new solution.

Loan to Swansea City
On 5 August 2019, Kalulu signed for EFL Championship club Swansea City on a season-long loan with an option to buy at the end of the season.

Return to Basel
Swansea did not pull the option and so Kalulu returned to Basel for their 2020–21 season under new head coach Ciriaco Sforza. However, things did not improve for the striker, he made only 12 appearances and this as substitute. At the end of this season his contract expired and he left the club. Between the years 2018 and 2021 Kalulu played a total of 51 games for Basel scoring just three goals. 27 of these games were in the Nationalliga A, five in the Swiss Cup, four in the UEFA competitions (Champios League and Europa League) and 15 were friendly games. He scored one goal in the cup and the other two during the test games.

Sochaux
On 29 June 2021, he returned to Sochaux and signed a three-year contract.

International career
Kalulu was born in France and is of Congolese descent. He is a former youth international for France at U18 level.

Personal life
Kalulu is the older brother of footballers Gédéon Kalulu and Pierre Kalulu.

Career statistics

Honours
Basel
 Swiss Cup: 2018–19

References

External links

 
 

1996 births
Living people
Footballers from Lyon
French footballers
France youth international footballers
Association football forwards
Olympique Lyonnais players
Stade Rennais F.C. players
FC Sochaux-Montbéliard players
FC Basel players
Swansea City A.F.C. players
Ligue 1 players
Ligue 2 players
Swiss Super League players
English Football League players
French expatriate footballers
Expatriate footballers in England
Expatriate footballers in Switzerland
French expatriate sportspeople in England
French expatriate sportspeople in Switzerland
French sportspeople of Democratic Republic of the Congo descent
Black French sportspeople